Manfred Brandl is an Austrian para-alpine skier. He represented Austria at the 1976 Winter Paralympics and he won three silver medals in alpine skiing.

Achievements

See also 

 List of Paralympic medalists in alpine skiing

References 

Living people
Year of birth missing (living people)
Place of birth missing (living people)
Paralympic alpine skiers of Austria
Alpine skiers at the 1976 Winter Paralympics
Medalists at the 1976 Winter Paralympics
Paralympic silver medalists for Austria
Paralympic medalists in alpine skiing